The 106th edition of the Tour of Flanders one-day cycling classic took place on 3 April 2022, as the 12th event of the 2022 UCI World Tour. The race began in Antwerp and covered  on the way to the finish in Oudenaarde.

Teams
Seventeen of the eighteen UCI WorldTeams and seven UCI ProTeams participated in the race, of which only , with six riders, did not enter the maximum of seven riders. From the field of 167 riders, there were 103 finishers.

UCI WorldTeams

 
 
 
 
 
 
 
 
 
 
 
 
 
 
 
 
 

UCI ProTeams

Result

References

2022 UCI World Tour
2022 in Belgian sport
2022
April 2022 sports events in Belgium